The chronology of Indian mathematicians spans from the Indus Valley civilisation and the Vedas to Modern India.

Indian mathematicians have made a number of contributions to mathematics that have significantly influenced scientists and mathematicians in the modern era. Hindu-Arabic numerals predominantly used today and likely into the future.

Ancient 
 Baudhayana sutras (fl. c. 900 BCE)
Yajnavalkya (700 BCE)
Manava (fl. 750–650 BCE)
Apastamba Dharmasutra (c. 600 BCE)
Pāṇini (c. 520–460 BCE)
 Kātyāyana (fl. c. 300 BCE)
Akspada Gautama(c. 600 BCE–200 CE)
Bharata Muni (200 BCE-200 CE)
Pingala (c. 3rd/2nd century BCE)

Classical
Post-Vedic Sanskrit to Pala period mathematicians (2nd century BCE to 11th century CE)

Medieval Period (1200–1800)

Kerala School of Mathematics and Astronomy 

 Madhava of Sangamagrama
 Parameshvara (1360–1455), discovered drk-ganita, a mode of astronomy based on observations
 Nilakantha Somayaji (1444–1545), mathematician and astronomer
 Shankara Variyar (c. 1530)
 Jyeshtadeva (1500–1610), author of Yuktibhāṣā
 Achyuta Pisharati (1550–7 July 1621), mathematician and astronomer
 Melpathur Narayana Bhattathiri (1560–1646/1666)

Navya-Nyāya (Neo-Logical) School 
 Raghunatha Siromani (1475–1550)
 Gangesha Upadhyaya (first half of the 14th century)

Others 

 Munishvara (17th century)
 Kamalakara (1657)
 Narayana Pandita (1325–1400)
 Mahendra Suri (14th century)
 Mulla Jaunpuri (1606–1651)

Born in 19th century

Born in 20th century

 Subbayya Sivasankaranarayana Pillai (1901–1950)
 Raj Chandra Bose (1901–1987)
 Tirukkannapuram Vijayaraghavan (1902–1955)
 Dattaraya Ramchandra Kaprekar (1905–1986)
 Lakkoju Sanjeevaraya Sharma (1907–1998)
 Subrahmanyan Chandrasekhar (1910–1995)
 S. S. Shrikhande (1917–2020)
 Prahalad Chunnilal Vaidya (1918–2010)
 Anil Kumar Gain (1919–1978)
 Calyampudi Radhakrishna Rao (born 1920)
 Harish-Chandra (1923–1983)
 P. K. Srinivasan (1924–2005)
 C. S. Seshadri (1932–2020)
 M. S. Narasimhan (1932–2021)
 Srinivasacharya Raghavan (born 1934)
 K. S. S. Nambooripad (1935–2020)
 Ramaiyengar Sridharan (born 1935)
 Vinod Johri (1935–2014)
 Karamat Ali Karamat (1936–2022)
 K. R. Parthasarathy (born 1936)
 S. N. Seshadri (1937–1986)
 Ramdas L. Bhirud (1937–1997)
 S. Ramanan (born 1937)
 Pranab K. Sen (born 1937)
 Veeravalli S. Varadarajan (1937–2019)
 Jayanta Kumar Ghosh (1937–2017)
 C. P. Ramanujam (1938–1974)
 V. N. Bhat (1938–2009)
 S. R. Srinivasa Varadhan (born 1940)
 M. S. Raghunathan (born 1941)
 Vashishtha Narayan Singh (1942–2019)
 C. R. Rao (born 1920)
 S. B. Rao (born 1943)
 Phoolan Prasad (born 1944)
 Gopal Prasad (born 1945)
 Vijay Kumar Patodi (1945–1976)
 S. G. Dani (born 1947)
 Raman Parimala (born 1948)
 Singhi Navin M. (born 1949)
 Sujatha Ramdorai
 R. Balasubramanian (born 1951)
 M. Ram Murty (born 1953)
 Alok Bhargava (born 1954)
 Rattan Chand (born 1955)
 V. Kumar Murty (born 1956)
 Rajendra Bhatia (born 1952)
 Narendra Karmarkar (born 1957)
 Dipendra Prasad (born 1960)
 Dinesh Thakur (born 1961)
 Manindra Agrawal (born 1966)
 Madhu Sudan (born 1966)
 Suresh Venapally (born 1966)
 Chandrashekhar Khare (born 1968)
 U. S. R. Murty
 Ramji Lal (born 1945)
 L. Mahadevan
 Kapil Hari Paranjape
 Vijay Vazirani (born 1957)
 Umesh Vazirani
 Mahan Mj (born 1968)
 Santosh Vempala (born 1971)
 Kannan Soundararajan (born 1973)
 Kiran Kedlaya (born 1974)
 Manjul Bhargava (born 1974)
 M.P.Chaudhary (born 1975)
 Ritabrata Munshi (born 1976)
 Amit Garg (born 1978)
 Subhash Khot (born 1978)
 Sourav Chatterjee (born 1979)
 Akshay Venkatesh (born 1981)
 Sucharit Sarkar (born 1983)
 Prakash belkale (born 1973)
 Probal chaudhari
 Bhargav bhatt (born 1983)
 Ravi vakil (born 1970)
 Neena Gupta (born 1984)
 Nayandeep Deka Baruah (born 1972)
 Anand Kumar (born 1973)

External links
 Famous Indian Mathematicians

Indian mathematicians
mathematicians